Two Wives may refer to:
Iddaru Pellalu (English title: Two Wives), 1954 Telugu drama film
Two Wives (1967 film), film directed by Yasuzo Masumura
Two Wives (2009 TV series), South Korean television series
Two Wives (2014 TV series), Philippine remake of the South Korean television series

See also

My Two Wives, 1992 Australian television series
Polygyny, when a man has two (or more) wives simultaneously